Cristóbal is a given name and surname.

Cristóbal or Cristobal may also refer to:

Places
 Cristóbal, Dominican Republic, a town
 Cristóbal, Colón, Panama, a port town and county
 Cristóbal Island, Panama

Other uses
 Tropical Storm Cristobal, a list of tropical cyclones with the name Cristobal.
 Cristobal (horse) (foaled 2004), a Thoroughbred racehorse